Dayton is an unincorporated community and census-designated place (CDP) in Lyon County, Nevada, United States. The population was 15,153 at the 2020 census. Dayton is the first Nevada settlement and home to the oldest hotel in Nevada.

History

Dayton is at the western end of the Twenty-Six Mile Desert at a bend in the Carson River. Immigrants stopping there for water would decide whether to follow the river south or continue west, giving the location its first name, Ponderers Rest. In 1849, Abner Blackburn, while heading for California, discovered a gold nugget in nearby Gold Creek, a tributary of the Carson River.

By 1850, placer miners settled at the mouth of Gold Cañon, working sand bars deposited over the millennia along the path of the creek. At first the settlement was just called "Gold Cañon" or "Gold Cañon Flat". Throughout the 1850s, Dayton served as the commercial hub for miners working in the canyon. In 1857 many Chinese miners came to the area to avoid mining taxes directed at the Chinese in California. With the 1859 discovery of the Comstock Lode, newly founded Gold Hill and Virginia City,  to the north, assumed prominence and most miners headed up the cañon. By 1860 the town was primarily occupied by Chinese miners and it was called "China Town" in the U.S. census of that year. However, soon people began to realize there was more profit in providing milling, goods, and services to the miners and thus came or returned to the area.

 
In 1861, the town officially adopted the name "Dayton", after John Day, a local surveyor who was later elected Surveyor General of Nevada in 1868, 1870, and 1874. On November 29, 1861, Dayton became the governmental seat for Lyon County.  Because of the availability of water from the Carson River, it soon became the first major milling center of the Comstock, and grew rapidly—from 78 residents in 1860 to 2,500 in 1865. Its 1864 courthouse was one of the first in Nevada. 
 
In 1866 and 1870 devastating "Great Fires" in Dayton greatly reduced the size of the town. The 1869 opening of the Virginia & Truckee Railroad shifted ore processing upstream to the Carson River Canyon, but Dayton continued to serve as a lesser center of commerce and government. Nonetheless, in the 1870s it was a much quieter, less prosperous town. The coming of the Carson & Colorado Railroad in 1881 brought back some prosperity to Dayton, but the population nonetheless hovered around 500 residents until after World War I.
 
In 1909, fire destroyed the Lyon County Courthouse. Residents of the growing agricultural community of Yerington to the south called for a shift of the Lyon County seat, which occurred in 1911, leaving Dayton with a shrinking economy and population. By the 1920s, the Lincoln Highway was bringing some tourists to Dayton, but the town remained a quiet reminder of a time when Nevada's gold and silver strikes captured national attention. It did not surpass its 1865 peak population of 2,500 until 1930.
 
In 1961, Dayton won fame as a setting for John Huston's film, The Misfits, the last movie appearances of Clark Gable and Marilyn Monroe. Beginning in the 1990s, Dayton experienced phenomenal growth as residential development expanded on the east side of the Carson River. The historic part of Dayton is within the Comstock Historic District, featuring a small but impressive main street, the monumental Odeon Hall, and a charming local museum located in an 1865 schoolhouse—the oldest in Nevada in its original location.
 
Dayton claims the designation of Nevada's oldest settlement, a title disputed by the residents of Genoa. Dayton points to the fact that when the wagon train of pioneer Lucena Parsons stayed at the mouth of Gold Cañon (today's Dayton) for several weeks waiting for the snow to leave the Sierra Nevada, she recorded in her journal that Colonel Reese and his party passed along the Carson River as they headed for the Sierra foothills to establish Mormon Station (today's Genoa). She had noted also that upon the wagon train's arrival about three weeks earlier, more than 200 miners were working the cañon. Today's residents of Genoa point to the region's first post office and several other aspects of town government, noting that their community deserves the title of  "Nevada's first town", a claim that Dayton residents do not care enough to dispute.

Dayton is listed as Nevada Historical Marker 7.

Geography
Dayton is located in western Lyon County at  (39.251707, -119.561943). It is bordered to the northwest by Silver City and about 12 miles to the east of Carson City, the state capital. U.S. Route 50 passes through the community, leading east  to Fallon and west  to Carson City.

Demographics

As of the census of 2000, there were 5,907 people, 2,198 households, and 1,674 families residing in the CDP. The population density was 186.3 people per square mile (71.9/km2). There were 2,322 housing units at an average density of 73.2 per square mile (28.3/km2). The racial makeup of the CDP was 91.4% White, 0.4% African American, 1.0% Native American, 1.0% Asian, 0.2% Pacific Islander, 3.8% from other races, and 2.2% from two or more races. Hispanic or Latino of any race were 8.8% of the population.

There were 2,198 households, out of which 37.7% had children under the age of 18 living with them, 61.6% were married couples living together, 9.6% had a female householder with no husband present, and 23.8% were non-families. 18.1% of all households were made up of individuals, and 4.6% had someone living alone who was 65 years of age or older. The average household size was 2.69 and the average family size was 3.03.

In the CDP, the population was spread out, with 28.1% under the age of 18, 6.1% from 18 to 24, 29.0% from 25 to 44, 25.0% from 45 to 64, and 11.9% who were 65 years of age or older. The median age was 37 years. For every 100 females, there were 102.6 males. For every 100 females age 18 and over, there were 99.2 males.

The median income for a household in the CDP was $43,599, and the median income for a family was $46,859. Males had a median income of $33,038 versus $26,140 for females. The per capita income for the CDP was $18,417. About 5.3% of families and 6.7% of the population were below the poverty line, including 8.2% of those under age 18 and 5.5% of those age 65 or over.

Economy
As of 2012, the greatest number of workers in Dayton (168) were employed in the retail trade industry  followed by the accommodation and food service industry with 138 employees and manufacturing with 56 employees.

The retail trade industry provided $56,637,000 in sales, shipments, receipts or revenue in 2012, which the highest of all industry and is followed by the manufacturing industry, which had a value of $10,562,000 in sales, shipments, receipts or revenue.

See also

Republic of Molossia, a micronation near Dayton

References

External links
 Dayton Area Chamber of Commerce
  Historical Society of Dayton Valley
 Online Nevada Encyclopedia

Census-designated places in Lyon County, Nevada
Census-designated places in Nevada
Pony Express stations
Populated places established in 1850
Chinatowns in the United States
1850 establishments in the United States